John Michaluk (November 2, 1928 – December 18, 1998) was a Canadian retired professional ice hockey left winger who played in one National Hockey League game for the Chicago Black Hawks during the 1950–51 NHL season.

He died in Calgary on December 18, 1998. John was the brother of the NHL hockey player Art Michaluk.

See also
List of players who played only one game in the NHL

References

External links

1928 births
1998 deaths
Calgary Stampeders players
Canadian ice hockey left wingers
Chicago Blackhawks players
Ice hockey people from Alberta
People from Canmore, Alberta
Providence Reds players
Quebec Aces (QSHL) players